Rebecca Schamber (born 7 December 1975) is a German politician of the Social Democratic Party (SPD) who has been serving as a member of the Bundestag since 2021.

Political career
Schamber became a member of the Bundestag in the 2021 elections, representing the Hannover-Land I district. In parliament, she has since been serving on the Defence Committee, the Committee on Economic Cooperation and Development, and the Subcommittee on the United Nations, International Organizations and Civil Crisis Prevention.

In addition to her committee assignments, Schamber has been an alternate member of the German delegation to the NATO Parliamentary Assembly since 2022.

Other activities
 German Network against Neglected Tropical Diseases (DNTDs), Member of the Parliamentary Advisory Board (since 2022)
 German United Services Trade Union (ver.di), Member

References 

Living people
1975 births
Social Democratic Party of Germany politicians
Members of the Bundestag 2021–2025
21st-century German politicians
21st-century German women politicians